The  is a limited express service operated by East Japan Railway Company (JR East) between  and  in Japan since 14 March 2015. The name Shirayuki was also previously used for an express service operated by Japanese National Railways (JNR) from 1963 until 1982.

Service outline
A total of five return workings operate daily.

Rolling stock
Services use a fleet of four four-car E653-1100 series EMUs converted from former Joban Line E653 series trainsets.

Formations
Trains are normally formed as four-car monoclass trainsets as shown below, with car 4 at the Niigata (northern) end. All cars are no-smoking.

History

See also
 List of named passenger trains of Japan

References

Named passenger trains of Japan
East Japan Railway Company
Railway services introduced in 1963
Railway services introduced in 2015
1963 establishments in Japan
2015 establishments in Japan